The 1990–91 Taça de Portugal was the 52nd edition of the Portuguese football knockout tournament, organized by the Portuguese Football Federation (FPF). The 1990–91 Taça de Portugal began in September 1990. The final was played on 2 June 1991 at the Estádio Nacional.

Estrela da Amadora were the previous holders, having defeated S.C. Farense 2–0 in the previous season's final. Cup holders Estrela da Amadora were eliminated in the seventh round by cup finalists Beira-Mar. In the final, Porto defeated Beira-Mar 3–1 to claim a seventh Taça de Portugal trophy. As a result of Porto winning the domestic cup competition, the Portistas faced 1990–91 Primeira Divisão winners Benfica in the 1991 Supertaça Cândido de Oliveira.

Sixth round
Ties were played between the 27 February and 13 March, whilst replays were played at a later date.

Seventh round
Ties were played on the 27 March, whilst replays where played at a later date.

Quarter-finals
Ties were played on the 17 April.

Semi-finals
Ties were played between the 1–9 May.

Final

References

Taça de Portugal seasons
Taca De Portugal, 1990-91
1990–91 domestic association football cups